Oludolapo Osinbajo, (née Soyode, born 16 July 1967) is a Nigerian lawyer and political figure. As the wife of the Vice President of Nigeria Yemi Osinbajo, she has been the Second Lady of Nigeria since 29 May 2015.

Early life and career
Oludolapo Soyode was born on 16 July 1967, and grew up in Ikenne. She attended the International School Ibadan. She is a granddaughter of Obafemi Awolowo, a Nigerian nationalist and Yoruba chief, and his wife Hannah Idowu Dideolu Awolowo, through Awolowo's daughter Ayodele Soyode (née Awolowo),

She married Yemi Osinbajo, a distant cousin, on 25 November 1989. In 1990 she was called to the Nigerian Bar.

Dolapo Osinbajo is the Executive Director of The Women's Helping Hand Initiative, a refuge facility in Epe, Lagos, established in 2014, and a co-founder of the Orderly Society Trust.

Activities as Second Lady
In September 2019 she presided at the 49th Benue Women in Prayer (BEWIP) Prayer Convocation in Makurdi. She also inaugurated Mama Abyol Children's Home and Benue Centre for Enterprise Development and Innovation (BENCEDI). In her speech to young people in Benue State, she warned them against attempting to copy illusory internet lifestyles. Speaking to out-of-school graduating girls in Lagos in December 2019, she encouraged them to live responsibly as good role models. She also characterised violence against women as an offence against humanity. In mid-December 2019 Nigeria's First Lady, Aisha Buhari, appointed Osinbajo – together with the wives of Nigerian state governors – as a 'champion' to lead the fight against tuberculosis in Nigeria.

In 2022 she made an official visit to the IAEA in Vienna.

Works
 They Call Me Mama: From the Under Bridge Diaries. 2014.

References

External links

1967 births
Living people
20th-century Nigerian lawyers
Nigerian women lawyers
Nigerian women in politics
Wives of national leaders
Yoruba women in politics
Awolowo family
Yoruba women lawyers
International School, Ibadan alumni